This list is to detail all Israeli ambassadors to the Holy See.

List of Ambassadors

Raphael Schutz 2021-
Oren David 2016 - 
Zion Evrony 2012 - 2016
Mordechay Lewy 2008 - 2012
Oded Ben-Hur 2003 - 2008
Nevill-Yosef Lamdan 2000 - 2003
Aharon Lopez 2000
Samuel Hadas 1997

References

Holy
Israel